Steven Mann (May 2, 1943 – September 9, 2009) was an American singer, songwriter, and guitarist based in California. Highly acclaimed by other musicians for his fingerpicking style, Mann performed in clubs in Los Angeles and San Francisco in the early 1960s, for a time backing up Janis Joplin in open mikes.  Mann's first professional credits were appearances on the debut albums recorded by Sonny and Cher  as a duo and Cher as a soloist, both in 1965. He also appeared on Dr. John's 1968 debut album and wrote a song recorded by Rod McKuen.

Mann stopped playing in the late 1960s because of mental health issues but resumed his career briefly in the early 2000s, performing in the Berkeley area. In 2005, with the help of some friends, he released an album of previously recorded material, plus a new song he had written. Mann died in 2009 of brain injuries suffered from a series of falls that occurred after undergoing surgery the previous year. The instrumental "Mann's Fate" was a tribute to Mann recorded by the group Hot Tuna on their live self-titled debut album in 1970.

History
Mann broke onto the West Coast music scene in the early 1960s. As a student at Valley State College in Los Angeles, Mann began to perform folk music at hootenannies and Los Angeles clubs like The Ash Grove and The Troubadour. He became friends with numerous artists on the folk music scene, including Hoyt Axton, Judy Henske, Gale Garnett, Jimmy Rubin, Jorma Kaukonen, and Terry Wadsworth (who later joined The New Christy Minstrels). In 1962, Mann was introduced to a young singer named Janis Joplin at an open mic performance at The Troubadour. Mann began accompanying Joplin on guitar, and the two  performed at open mics in the Los Angeles area. They stopped performing together when Mann temporarily relocated to San Francisco. While in San Francisco, Mann also met singer/songwriter Ivan Ulz with whom he co-wrote two songs, one of which was recorded by Rod McKuen.

Around 1967 Mann suffered a mental breakdown and went into partial retirement. His few recordings became collector's items and his music became legendary among blues guitar aficionados. In 2003, Mann moved to Berkeley, California where he began to perform again with the help of friends Will Scarlett and Janet Smith of Bella Roma Music. In 2005, Mann released a new album on CD, Steve Mann: Alive and Pickin''', which featured re-releases of previously recorded material, including performances with Janis Joplin, as well as a new song written and performed by Mann.

In July 2009, the studio master tape of "Straight Life" was provided by John Lyon who had protected it from destruction since the 1970s. The tape has been digitized and re-released on CD by Bella Roma Music. Mann died on September 9, 2009 in Berkeley, California.

DiscographySteve Mann: Alive and Pickin', Bella Roma Music, 2005Steve Mann Live at the Ash Grove, Bella Roma Music, reissued 2005 (originally released 1975)Steve Mann: Straight Life'', 2009, Bella Roma Music

External links
Steve Mann Obituary, Folkworks
Steve Mann Discography, Wirz' American Music
Liner Notes, Steve Mann Live at the Ash Grove, Wirz' American Music
"Janis and Me", Steve Mann (self-published account)

1943 births
2009 deaths
Songwriters from California
American folk guitarists
American male guitarists
20th-century American guitarists
Guitarists from California
20th-century American male musicians
American male songwriters